Deltote bellicula, known generally as the bog deltote or bog lithacodia moth, is a species of moth in the family Noctuidae (the owlet moths).

The MONA or Hodges number for Deltote bellicula is 9046.

References

Further reading

 
 
 

Eustrotiinae
Articles created by Qbugbot
Moths described in 1818